This is a list of notable Sorbian Language writers.

B
Jakub Bart-Ćišinski (1856–1909)
Jurij Brězan (1916–2006)

D
Benedikt Dyrlich (born 1950), writer, journalist and politician.

K
Jurij Koch (born 1936)
Mato Kosyk (1853-1940)
Marja Kubašec (18901976)

L
Kito Lorenc (1938-2017)

S
Kita Fryco Stempel (1787-1867), poet.
Bogumił Šwjela (1873–1948), pastor, editor, journalist, language scholar

W
Mina Witkojc (1893–1975)

Z
Handrij Zejler (1804–1872)

See also
List of Sorbs
Sorbian language
Sorbian literature
Bible translations into Sorbian

References

Sorbian